The Global Chinese Pop Chart (全球华语歌曲排行榜, quánqiú huáyŭ gēqŭ páihángbàng) is a Chinese language pop music chart compiled by 7 Chinese language radio stations across Asia. It was founded in 2001 by Beijing Music Radio, Shanghai Eastern Broadcasting (zh), Radio Guangdong, Radio Television Hong Kong, Hit Fm Taiwan, subsequently replaced by Taipei Pop Radio, and Malaysia's 988 FM. 

The chart's definition of "Chinese language" covers all three main genres of C-pop: Mandopop, Cantopop and Hokkien pop.

Number-one songs
List of Global Chinese Pop Chart number-one songs of 2017
List of Global Chinese Pop Chart number-one songs of 2018

Awards
The awards and concert take place in the first week of September each year
 2001 - Beijing Capital Indoor Stadium
 2002 - Guangdong Tianhe Stadium
 2003 - Shanghai Indoor Stadium
 2004 - National Taiwan University Gymnasium
 2005 - Kuala Lumpur's Putra Indoor Stadium
 2006 - Singapore,
 2007 - Hong Kong
 2008 - Hong Kong
 2009 - Beijing Exhibition Center
 2010 - Hong Kong Coliseum

References

External links
 Beijing Music Radio
 Guangdong 993 FM
 Hong Kong Radio and Television
 Shanghai Eastern Broadcasting
 Taipei HitFM (original Taipei member)
 Taipei FM91.7 (new Taipei member)
 Singapore 933FM
 Malaysia 988FM

Chinese record charts
C-pop